Buyandelgeriin Bold (born 25 August 1960) is a Mongolian wrestler. He competed in the men's Greco-Roman 68 kg at the 1980 Summer Olympics.

References

External links
 

1960 births
Living people
Mongolian male sport wrestlers
Olympic wrestlers of Mongolia
Wrestlers at the 1980 Summer Olympics
Sportspeople from Ulaanbaatar
Asian Games gold medalists for Mongolia
Asian Games medalists in wrestling
Wrestlers at the 1982 Asian Games
Medalists at the 1982 Asian Games
20th-century Mongolian people
21st-century Mongolian people